The Humanistisch Verbond (HV, sometimes translated as Humanistic Association Netherlands, Dutch Humanist Association or Dutch Humanist League) is a Dutch association based on secular humanist principles.

Basics 
The foundation of the HV is that everyone is responsible for their own actions, but also has co-responsibility for the environment and others. The HV strives to spread and protect values such as self-determination, equal treatment and toleration. These have freedom of choice and personal responsibility at their core.

The HV uses slogans such as:
Zelf denken, samen leven ("Thinking for yourself, living together")
Het Humanistisch Verbond wil een inspiratiebron en ontmoetingsplaats zijn. Het behartigt tevens de belangen van mensen die zich in het humanisme herkennen ("The Humanistisch Verbond wants to be a source of inspiration and place to meet up. It also looks after the interests of people who identify with humanism") In 2022, the organisation stated that it had about 17,000 paying members, up from 13,000 in 2016 

The services offered by the HV include speeches at funerals, humanist mental care and celebrating relationships.

Netherlands

The Humanistisch Verbond (HV) was founded on 17 February 1946 as a response to 'spiritual nihilism' - that was held partially responsible for the atrocities of the Second World War - and the slighting of the non-religious in the Netherlands. The initiators were, amongst others, Jaap van Praag, Garmt Stuiveling and Jan Brandt Corstius. The widow of the prominent freethinker and humanist Leo Polak, Henriette Polak, was also closely involved in the foundation. The goal of the HV was uniting all humanists and deepening, spreading and defending the humanist worldview. Nowadays the HV focuses on the motto Zelf denken, samen leven ("Thinking for yourself, living together") to fulfilling two core tasks:
Formulating humanist perspectives to current worldview and personal questions;
Reinforcing and establishing humanist services, including humanist mental care, humanist funeral guidance and humanist formative education.
The Humanistisch Verbond is one of the founders of the Dutch humanist umbrella, the Humanistische Alliantie, and is member of the European Humanist Federation and International Humanist and Ethical Union.

Chairs 
Chair of the Humanistisch Verbond were:
1946: J. Hoetink
1946–1969 Jaap van Praag
1969–1977 Max Rood
1977–1987 Rob Tielman
1987–1993 Jan Glastra van Loon
1993–1995 Paul Cliteur
1996–1998) Marjan Verkerk
1998–2001 Liesbeth Mulder
2001–2003 Frits van Vugt
2003–2005 Roger van Boxtel
2005–2012 Rein Zunderdorp
2012–2020: Boris van der Ham
2020–present: Mardjan Seighali

See also 
 De Vrije Gedachte
 Non-believers: Freethinkers on the Run

References

External links
 Official website

Organizations established in 1947
Humanist associations
Organisations based in Amsterdam